Altes Rathaus (German for Old Town Hall) may refer to:

Altes Rathaus, Vienna, Austria
Altes Rathaus, Hanover, Germany
Rathaus (Freiburg im Breisgau), Germany
Rathaus (Oldenburg), Germany
Old Town Hall, Halle (Saale), Germany
Old Town Hall (Leipzig), Germany
Old Town Hall, Munich, Germany
Old Town Hall, Szczecin, Poland

See also
 Altes Stadthaus (disambiguation)